South Shore station is an electrified commuter rail station along the South Chicago Branch of the Metra Electric Line, in the South Shore neighborhood of Chicago.

Along with Windsor Park and Cheltenham stations, South Shore Station is one of three that run along the median of Exchange Avenue, just southeast of 71st Street, which contains Stony Island Avenue and Bryn Mawr stations. Limited side-street parking is available for this station along 72nd Street between Exchange Avenue and Yates Boulevard. Bus connections are provided by the Chicago Transit Authority.

Bus connections
CTA
  6 Jackson Park Express
  26 South Shore Express 
  71 71st/South Shore

References

External links

Yates Boulevard entrance from Google Maps Street View
72nd Street entrance from Google Maps Street View

South Shore